Taveta Constituency is an electoral constituency in Kenya. It is one of four constituencies in Taita-Taveta County. The constituency has five county assembly wards, all belonging to the Taita-Taveta County. The constituency was established for the 1966 elections.

Members of Parliament

Locations and wards

References 

Constituencies in Taita-Taveta County
Constituencies in Coast Province
1966 establishments in Kenya
Constituencies established in 1966